The Marilyn Denis Show is a Canadian daytime television talk show which debuted on January 10, 2011, on CTV and CTV 2 (formerly A-Channel). Hosted by Marilyn Denis, the show airs weekdays at 10 a.m. on CTV and 11 a.m. ET on CTV 2 (timeslots vary in other time zones).

The show has a lifestyle-oriented format similar to Denis's previous Citytv talk show CityLine, but also regularly features celebrity entertainment guests, which are not commonplace on the Citytv program. Denis had left CityLine in 2008 following the split of the assets of CHUM Limited (Denis was primarily employed as morning co-host on CHUM-FM, which was retained by CTV, whilst her secondary employer Citytv was acquired by Rogers). The current program is produced in the same Toronto building (at 299 Queen Street West) in which CityLine was based during Denis's tenure, in the same studio as CityLine which was renovated specifically for the show.

On November 17, 2015, the show celebrated its 1000th episode.

The Best of The Marilyn Denis Show
A spin-off version of The Marilyn Denis Show also airs on the weekends which features a selection of Marilyn's favourite moments from the past week. The show airs Saturdays at 2 p.m. on CTV, and Sundays at 2 p.m. on CTV 2 (timeslots vary in other time zones).

TV Crew

Home, Design & Garden Experts

 Debbie Travis
 Hilary Farr
 Candice Olson
 Drew Scott
 Jonathan Scott
 Owen Reeves
 Jane Lockhart 
 Amanda Forrest
 Andrew Pike
 Aly Velji
 Cheryl Torrenueva
 Glen Peloso
 Kasia Waloszczyk
 Michael Penney
 Scott McGillivray
 Ramsin Khachi
 Katie Hunt

Family, Health & Lifestyles 

 Alyson Schafer 
 Ashley Howe
 Candice Batista
 Chantel Guertin
 Jill Dunn
 Joe Rich
 Julie Daniluk
 Miranda Malisani
 Mubina Jiwa
 Dr. Nancy Durand
 Natasha Turner 
 Dr. Scott Gledhill
 Sebastien Centner
 Dr. Brett Belchetz
 Samantha Montpetit-Huynh
 Charles The Butler

Cooking Experts
 Mary Berg
 Allyson Bobbitt & Sarah Bell
 Michael Bonacini
 Lynn Crawford
 Christine Cushing
 Roger Mooking
 Anna Olson
 Suzanne Husseini

Entertaining Experts
 Sebastien Centner

Fashion Experts
 Alexis Honce
 Peter Papapetrou
 Natalie Sexton

Tech Experts
 Amber MacArthur

Finance Experts
 Kevin O'Leary

References

External links 
 The Marilyn Denis Show

CTV Television Network original programming
CTV 2 original programming
2011 Canadian television series debuts
2010s Canadian television talk shows
2020s Canadian television talk shows
Television series by Bell Media
Television shows filmed in Toronto
Television productions suspended due to the COVID-19 pandemic